The mixed doubles curling tournament of the 2022 Winter Olympics was held at the Beijing National Aquatics Center from 2 to 8 February 2022. Ten nations competed in a round robin preliminary round, and the top four nations at the conclusion of the round robin (Norway, Italy, Great Britain, and Sweden) qualified for the medal round. This will be the second time mixed doubles is held at the Winter Olympics.

Qualification

The top seven nations at the 2021 World Mixed Doubles Curling Championship qualified along with hosts China. The final two teams qualified through the 2021 Olympic Qualification Event.

Teams
Teams have one male and one female thrower, with one curler throwing rocks #1 and #5 and the other throwing rocks #2, #3 and #4.

Round-robin standings

Round-robin results
All draw times are listed in China Standard Time (UTC+08:00).

Draw 1
Wednesday, 2 February, 20:05

Draw 2
Thursday, 3 February, 09:05

Draw 3
Thursday, 3 February, 14:05

Draw 4
Thursday, 3 February, 20:05

Draw 5
Friday, 4 February, 08:35

Draw 6
Friday, 4 February, 13:35

Draw 7
Saturday, 5 February, 09:05

Draw 8
Saturday, 5 February, 14:05

Draw 9
Saturday, 5 February, 20:05

Draw 10
Sunday, 6 February, 09:05

Draw 11
Sunday, 6 February, 14:05

Draw 12
Sunday, 6 February, 20:05

Draw 13
Monday, 7 February, 09:05

Playoffs

Semifinals
Monday, 7 February, 20:05

Bronze medal game
Tuesday, 8 February, 14:05

Gold medal game
Tuesday, 8 February, 20:05

Final standings
The final standings are:

Statistics

Player percentages

Percentages by draw.

Female

Male

Team total

References

mixed
Mixed events at the 2022 Winter Olympics
Mixed doubles curling